Walter Marcus William Nye (August 3, 1945 – July 16, 2022) was an American attorney and politician who served as a Democratic member of the Idaho Senate from the 29th District. Nye previously represented the same district in the Idaho House of Representatives from 2014 to 2016.

Early life, education, and career
Born in New York City in 1945, Nye was raised in Pocatello, Idaho, descending from early pioneers of the Idaho Territory. He graduated from Pocatello High School in 1963 and earned a Bachelor of Arts from Harvard College in 1967. He then returned to Idaho and earned a Juris Doctor from the University of Idaho College of Law in 1974.

Career 
Nye began practicing law in Pocatello in 1974. He was the past president of the Idaho State Bar and served on the American Bar Association Board of Governors.

Idaho House of Representatives
In 2014, incumbent Idaho Representative Carolyn Meline announced she would not seek reelection. Nye subsequently announced his candidacy for the Idaho House of Representatives. He was unopposed in the Democratic primary and defeated Republican Matthew Bloxham and Libertarian Matthew Larsen, both of Pocatello, in the general election.

Committee assignments
From 2014 to 2016, he served on the Judiciary, Rules and Administration Committee, Local Government Committee, and Revenue and Taxation Committee.

Idaho Senate
In 2016, incumbent Idaho Senator Roy Lacey announced he would not seek reelection. Nye subsequently announced his candidacy for Idaho Senate. Nye was unopposed in the Democratic primary and defeated Republican Tom Katsilometes and Libertarian Sierra "Idaho Lorax" Carta in the general election.

Idaho law allows any voter to challenge the election of a legislator, and the respective legislative body has full discretion to judge the election and qualifications of members in deciding whether to seat them. Nye's Republican opponent Katsilometes challenged Nye's election on the grounds that Nye had allegedly violated campaign finance laws and vote counting irregularities. The Idaho Senate dismissed the challenge unanimously and seated Nye. It was the first time an election had been challenged since 1981.

Committee assignments
 Finance Committee
 Joint Finance-Appropriations Committee
 Judiciary and Rules Committee
 Local Government and Taxation

Elections

Personal life
Nye died on July 16, 2022, at the age of 76.

References

1945 births
2022 deaths
21st-century American politicians
Democratic Party Idaho state senators
Harvard University alumni
Democratic Party members of the Idaho House of Representatives
People from Pocatello, Idaho
Politicians from New York City
Idaho lawyers
University of Idaho College of Law alumni